The Joseph M. Sanzari Children's Hospital (JMSCH) at Hackensack University Medical Center is a pediatric acute care hospital with 105 beds. It is a designated New Jersey children's hospital and full institutional member of the National Association of Children's Hospitals.

It is affiliated with the Hackensack Meridian School of Medicine at Seton Hall University, Rutgers University New Jersey Medical School, University of Medicine and Dentistry of New Jersey-New Jersey Medical School in Newark, and is a member of the Hackensack Meridian Health system. JMSCH provides comprehensive pediatric specialties and sub-specialties for infants, children, teens, and young adults aged 0–22 throughout Northern New Jersey.

About

Patient care units 
The hospital has a variety of patient care units to provide services for infants, children, teens, and young adults in all conditions.

 15-bed Pediatric Intensive Care Unit (PICU)
 40-bed, Level III Neonatal Intensive Care Unit (NICU)
 16-bed inpatient pediatric oncology unit
 6-bed Pediatric Epilepsy Monitoring Unit
 28-bed general inpatient pediatric unit

Services 
The hospital has a comprehensive list of pediatric specialties and subspecialties including adolescent medicine, audiology, cardiology, dermatology, developmental medicine, endocrinology, emergency services, gastroenterology, genetics, hematology, nephrology, neurology, oncology, orthopedics, otolaryngology, pulmonology, rheumatology, and urology.

The hospital is the only hospital in New Jersey that offers pediatric blood and marrow transplantation.

Awards 
The Joseph M. Sanzari Children's Hospital received a Top 50 national ranking in Pediatric Neurology and Neurosurgery in U.S. News & World Report’s 2017–18 Best Children’s Hospitals.

In 2019, 2020, and 2021 the hospital was listed as the number one children's hospital in New Jersey by U.S. News & World Report.

In 2020, The Joseph M. Sanzari Children's Hospital ranked 44 nationally in pediatric oncology. It ranked 49 nationally in the field of Pediatric Neurology & Neurosurgery by the U.S. News & World Report.

The hospital is also accredited by the ANCC as a nurse magnet hospital because of its commitment to the advancement of nursing.

History 
Before constructing the new women's and children's pavilion, pediatrics at Hackensack University Medical Center were conducted on the second, third, and sixth floors of the Conklin building.

The Sarkis and Siran Gabrellian Women's and Children's Pavilion, where Sanzari Children's Hospital is housed, was opened in 2005. The pavilion houses both the Joseph M. Sanzari Children's Hospital and the Donna A. Sanzari Women's Hospital. The design of the building allows women who recently gave birth to have their baby treated in the same building. The entire pavilion contains 192 beds, while 105 are dedicated for pediatrics. The pavilion has won awards due to its innovative environmental hospital designs.

See also 

 List of children's hospitals in the United States
 Hackensack University Medical Center
 K. Hovnanian Children's Hospital
 Jersey Shore University Medical Center

References

External links 
 Hackensack Meridian Health School of Medicine
 Joseph M. Sanzari Children's Hospital Website

Hospitals in New Jersey
Hackensack, New Jersey
Hospitals in Bergen County, New Jersey
Children's hospitals in the United States
Children's hospitals in New Jersey
Hospital buildings completed in 2006